Arvind Chandrakant Patil is an Indian politician who was a member of the Karnataka Legislative Assembly from Khanapur Vidhan Sabha constituency from 2013 to 2018.

In 2018, he was defeated by Anjali Nimbalkar of Indian National Congress. Anjali got a total of 36,649 votes while BJP candidate Vithal Halagekar was at second with 31,516 votes.

References 

Living people
People from Karnataka
Karnataka MLAs 2013–2018
Independent politicians in India
1968 births